The Philippine Senate Committee on Games and Amusement is a standing committee of the Senate of the Philippines.

This committee, along with the Committee on Sports, was formed after the Committee on Games, Amusement and Sports was split into two on August 1, 2016, pursuant to Senate Resolution No. 3 of the 17th Congress.

Jurisdiction 
According to the Rules of the Senate, the committee handles all matters relating to games and amusement, such as, but not limited to, casinos, lotteries, jai-alai and horse-racing.

Members, 18th Congress 
Based on the Rules of the Senate, the Senate Committee on Games and Amusement has 9 members.

The President Pro Tempore, the Majority Floor Leader, and the Minority Floor Leader are ex officio members.

Here are the members of the committee in the 18th Congress as of September 24, 2020:

Committee secretary: Felipe T. Yadao, Jr

See also 

 List of Philippine Senate committees

References 

Games